Gunnar Handal (born 25 March 1936) is a Norwegian educationalist.

He was born in Bergen. From 1992 to his retirement he served as professor of university pedagogy. He had then led the "Study Quality Committee" from 1989 to 1990, which highlighted quality in university studies. In 2003 he was awarded the Kristian Ottosen Prize for promoting student welfare.

He resides at Grav.

References

1936 births
Living people
Writers from Bergen
University of Oslo alumni
Academic staff of the University of Oslo
Norwegian educationalists